Feelin' the Spirit is an album by vocalist Jimmy Witherspoon featuring that was recorded in 1957 and released by the HiFi label.

Reception

Thomas Ward of AllMusic stated, "The finest collection of Jimmy Witherspoon's gospel songs, Feelin' the Spirit is an essential addition to any Witherspoon collection. ... Witherspoon's voice and style are so distinctive that they make these songs seem new ... Never strictly a gospel artist, all of these recordings show sincerity and, more importantly, depth, both musically and spiritually".

Track listing
All compositions are traditional except where noted
 "Every Time I Feel the Spirit" – 2:17
 "Deep River" – 1:55
 "I Couldn't Hear Nobody Pray" – 2:17
 "Sometimes I Feel Like a Motherless Child" – 2:30
 "Nobody Knows the Trouble I've Seen" – 2:07
 "I Want to Be Ready" – 1:30
 "Steal Away to Jesus" – 2:00
 "Oh Mary, Don't You Weep" – 1:45
 "Go Down Moses" – 3:00
 "The Time Has Come" (Jimmy Witherspoon, Teddy Edwards) – 2:55

Personnel
Jimmy Witherspoon – vocals
 Randy Van Horn Singers – backing vocals
Other musicians unidentified

References

Jimmy Witherspoon albums
1959 albums
Gospel albums by American artists